Francis I of the Two Sicilies (19 August 1777 –  8 November 1830) was King of the Two Sicilies from 1825 to 1830 and regent of the Kingdom of Sicily from 1806 to 1814.

Early life

Francis was born the son of Ferdinand I of the Two Sicilies and his wife Archduchess Maria Carolina of Austria in Naples. He was also the nephew of Marie Antoinette and Louis XVI, the last King and Queen of France before the first French Republic.

At the death of his older brother Carlo, Duke of Calabria, Francis became the heir-apparent to the throne and Duke of Calabria, the traditional title of the heir apparent to the Neapolitan throne.

Later life 
In 1796 Francis married his double first cousin Archduchess Maria Clementina of Austria, daughter of Leopold II, Holy Roman Emperor. When she died, he married his first cousin María Isabella, daughter of King Charles IV of Spain.

After the Bourbon family fled from Naples to Sicily in 1806, Lord William Bentinck, the British resident, had drafted a new constitution along British and French lines. Ferdinand agreed to abdicate his throne, with Francis being appointed regent in 1812.

On the abdication of Napoleon I, his father returned to Naples and suppressed the Sicilian constitution, incorporating his two kingdoms into that of the Two Sicilies (1816); Francis then assumed the revived title of duke of Calabria. While still heir apparent he professed liberal ideas, and on the outbreak of the revolution of 1820 he accepted the regency, apparently in a friendly spirit towards the new constitution, although he was actually as conservative as his father.

On succeeding to the throne in 1825, he pursued a conservative course. He took little part in the government, which he left in the hands of favourites and police officials, and lived with his mistresses, surrounded by soldiers, ever in dread of assassination. During his reign the only revolutionary movement was the outbreak on the Cilento (1828), repressed by the Marquis Delcarretto, an ex-Liberal. He was, however, successful in having the Austrian occupation force withdrawn (1827), thereby relieving a large financial burden on the treasury.

During his reign, the Royal Order of Francis I was founded to reward civil merit.

Issue
With Maria Clementina of Austria:

 Maria Carolina (1798–1870), who married, firstly, Charles Ferdinand, Duke of Berry, the second son of King Charles X of France; and secondly, Ettore Count Lucchesi Palli, Prince di Campofranco, Duke della Grazia.
 Ferdinando, Duke of Noto (1800–1801).

With Isabella of Spain:

 Luisa Carlotta (1804–1844), who married her mother's younger brother Infante Francisco de Paula of Spain.
 María Cristina (1806–1878), who married firstly her uncle Ferdinand VII of Spain (her mother's older brother); and secondly, Ferdinand Muñoz, Duke of Rianzares.
 Ferdinand II of the Two Sicilies (1810–1859), who became Francis I's successor and married twice.
 Carlo Ferdinando, Prince of Capua (1811–1862), who morganatically wed Penelope Smyth and had issue.
 Leopoldo Beniamino, Count of Syracuse (1813–1860), who married Princess Maria of Savoy-Carignan. No issue.
 Maria Antonia (1814–1898) who married Leopold II, Grand Duke of Tuscany.
 Antonio Pasquale, Count of Lecce (1816–1843).
 Maria Amalia (1818–1857), who married Infante Sebastian of Portugal and Spain.
 Maria Carolina (1820–1861), who married Don Carlos de Bourbon, Count of Montemolin, Carlist pretender to the throne of Spain.
 Teresa Cristina (1822–1889), who married Emperor Pedro II of Brazil.
 Luigi Carlo, Count of Aquila (1824–1897), who married Januária, Princess Imperial of Brazil (sister of Pedro II of Brazil and Maria II of Portugal). Had issue.
 Francesco di Paola, Count of Trapani (1827–1892), who married Archduchess Maria Isabella of Austria, Princess of Tuscany, and had issue.

Ancestry

References

 

1777 births
1830 deaths
Monarchs of the Kingdom of the Two Sicilies
Viceroys of Sicily
Princes of Bourbon-Two Sicilies
Grand Crosses of the Order of Saint Stephen of Hungary
Knights of the Golden Fleece of Spain
Neapolitan princes
Sicilian princes
Burials at the Basilica of Santa Chiara
18th-century Roman Catholics
19th-century Roman Catholics
Italian Roman Catholics